Jonina Ros Guomundsdottir (born 6 July 1958) is a member of parliament of the Althing, the Icelandic parliament. She is a member of the Social Democratic Alliance. She has been a member of the Icelandic Delegation to the EFTA since 2009.

External links
Althing biography

Living people
1958 births
Jonina Ros Gudmundsdottir
Jonina Ros Gudmundsdottir
Jonina Ros Gudmundsdottir